"Sure" is a single by British boy band Take That, released as the lead single from their third studio album, Nobody Else (1995). It was written by Take That's lead singer Gary Barlow and fellow band members Robbie Williams and Mark Owen. Released on 3 October 1994, the song became the band's fifth number one on the UK Singles Chart and has received a silver disc certification in the UK for selling over 200,000 copies. Q Magazine ranked "Sure" at number 86 in their list of the "1001 Best Songs Ever" in 2003.

Critical reception
Chuck Campbell from Knoxville News Sentinel described the song as "slinky" and "hip-hoppish", adding that songs like "Sure" "are serviceable as updates of British blue-eyed soul". Pan-European magazine Music & Media commented, "International stardom is not enough. Concerns about the credibility factor are the latest craze in teenland. Yet through "Sure"s hip and raw swingbeat production even Take That enemies will have to give in." Alan Jones from Music Week gave the song five out of five and named it Pick of the Week, adding that it is "far from their most distinctive track, but this slick piece of synthetic soul balladry has all the ingredients necessary to keep the Take That bandwagon rolling." He concluded, "Clearly one to watch."

Release and chart performance
The single was released on 3 October 1994. Take That's previous single had stalled at number three on the UK Singles Chart after four consecutive number-one hits, but "Sure" debuted at number one becoming their fifth number-one single. It remained at the top for two weeks but dropped quickly thereafter. It was the 42nd best selling single of 1994 in the UK, the lowest-selling number-one single of the year.

Music video
The accompanying music video for "Sure" is seven minutes long and somewhat comical. It shows the band preparing for a party in their apartment whilst also babysitting a disruptive 5-year-old girl named Emily who is halting them from getting ready while her mother is out of town. Gary Barlow is writing a song, Jason Orange is dancing and Mark Owen is preparing food and struggling to deal with Emily throwing her food on the table while answering phone calls about the party. When Robbie Williams returns from grocery shopping, Howard Donald takes the calls in Owen's place. Once Owen is finally able to tuck Emily into bed, the song starts, and many guests arrive for the party. As several couples hook up at the party, the band are seen performing the song in vest nets against a blue backdrop. As the guests leave the party, one girl is left behind and falls asleep in the trashed apartment. The video ends with Emily waking up in the middle of the night to find the band asleep amidst the disarray from the party.

A shorter edited version of the song exists in which music video channels play the video from where the song starts. It was A-listed on Germany's VIVA in November 1994.

Track listings

 UK and European CD1 
 "Sure"
 "Sure" (Thumpers club mix)
 "Sure" (Full Pressure mix)
 "Sure" (Strictly Barking dub)

 UK and European CD2 
 "Sure" – 3:40
 "No si aqui no hay amor"
 "Why Can't I Wake Up with You" (club mix)
 "You Are the One" (Tonic Mix)

 UK 12-inch single 
A1. "Sure" (Thumpers club mix) – 8:21
B1. "Sure" (Brothers in Rhythm mix) – 3:40
B2. "Sure" (Full Pressure mix) – 5:37

 UK cassette single 
 "Sure"
 "No si aqui no hay amor"

Personnel
 Gary Barlow – lead vocals
 Howard Donald – backing vocals
 Jason Orange – backing vocals
 Mark Owen – backing vocals
 Robbie Williams – backing vocals

Charts

Weekly charts

Year-end charts

Certifications

References

1994 singles
1994 songs
Number-one singles in Scotland
Songs written by Gary Barlow
Songs written by Mark Owen
Songs written by Robbie Williams
Take That songs
UK Singles Chart number-one singles